Miss Mexico 2018 was the 2nd edition of the Miss Mexico pageant, held on Saturday May 5, 2018 at the Imperial Hall of Villa Toscana Eventos in Hermosillo, Sonora, Mexico. The winner was Vanessa Ponce de León of Ciudad de México (Mexico City) and she represented Mexico in Miss World 2018. Ponce de León was crowned by outgoing titleholder Andrea Meza.

Final results

Placements

Special Awards

Challenges

Beauty With a Purpose

Talent

Beach Beauty

Top Model

Sports

Dances of México

Multimedia

Judges

Final Judges
These are the members of the judges who evaluated the contestants during the finals:

 Mariana Berumen - Miss World Mexico 2012
 Daniela Álvarez - Miss World Mexico 2014
 Alexander González - Image Advisor and International Speaker
 Duc Vincie - International Fashion Designer
 Nabani Matus - Aesthetic Surgeon
 Gerardo Murray - Vice-president of Brands, Marketing and Business Strategy of Intercontinental Hotels Group
 Heriberto Martínez - Connoisseur of beauty contests

Preliminary Judges
These are the members of the preliminary judges, who chose the 16 semifinalists, after seeing the candidates in during private interview sessions and catwalk sessions in swimsuits and evening gowns:

 Mariana Berumen - Miss World Mexico 2012
 Daniela Álvarez - Miss World Mexico 2014
 Alexander González - Image Advisor and International Speaker
 Duc Vincie - International Fashion Designer
 Nabani Matus - Aesthetic Surgeon
 Gerardo Murray - Vice-president of Brands, Marketing and Business Strategy of Intercontinental Hotels Group
 Heriberto Martínez - Connoisseur of beauty contests

Official Delegates

Notes

Replacements
 - Ivonne Hernández was appointed to represent Michoacán after the original state titleholder, Daniela Frutos, resigned due to personal reasons.

References

External links
Official Website

2018 in Mexico
2018 beauty pageants
Beauty pageants in Mexico